The Drowning Creek Formation is a geologic formation in Ohio. It dates back to the Silurian.

References

Silurian Ohio
Silurian System of North America
Rhuddanian
Aeronian
Telychian